The Minister of Agriculture and Forestry is one of the Finnish Government's ministerial portfolios. The minister is in charge of the Ministry of Agriculture and Forestry. Since April 2022, Finland's Minister of Agriculture and Forestry has been Antti Kurvinen of the Centre Party.

List of ministers

Key

Ministers

References

See also 
 Ministry of Agriculture and Forestry (Finland)
 Politics of Finland

Lists of government ministers of Finland